The Pitt River is a river in Fiordland, New Zealand. It rises north-west of Oilskin Pass and flows north-westward into Lake Beddoes and Wild Natives River.

See also
List of rivers of New Zealand

References

Rivers of Fiordland